This article lists political parties in Luxembourg.

Luxembourg has a multi-party system with three strong political parties; two other moderately successful parties have emerged recently.  No single party has a chance of gaining power alone, and parties must work with each other to form coalition governments.

Current parties
The number given for local councillors is the total of councillors elected to communal councils that employ proportional representation.  In majoritarian communes, parties do not usually run in the same manner, making comparisons difficult.

Parliamentary parties

Non-parliamentary parties

Defunct parties

Pre-1945 parties
 Independent National Party
 Liberal League
 Liberal Left
 Party of the Right
 Radical Liberal Party
 Radical Party
 Socialist Party
 Volksdeutsche Bewegung

Post-1945 parties
 Communist League of Luxemburg, a Maoist party
 Enrôlés de Force, a single-issue party
 Free Party of Luxembourg, a right-wing populist party
 Green and Liberal Alliance, a green liberal party
 National Movement, a far-right party
 Party of the Third Age, a pensioners' party
 Popular Independent Movement, a single-issue party
 Revolutionary Socialist Party, a Trotskyist party
 Social Democratic Party, a social democratic party
 The Taxpayer, a libertarian party

See also
 Politics of Luxembourg
 List of political parties by country

Footnotes

Luxembourg
 
Political parties
Political parties
Luxembourg